Orchard Place may refer to:

Orchard Place Airport/Douglas Field, now called O'Hare International Airport and still abbreviated as "ORD"
Orchard Place, Des Moines, Iowa, a social service agency in Des Moines Iowa providing mental health services to youth and families.
Orchard Place, Illinois, the small community where the airport was originally built and received its name
Orchard Place, London, a peninsula on the River Thames in Tower Hamlets, London